The Ireland women's cricket team toured the Netherlands to play against the Netherlands women's cricket team in August 2022. The series consisted of three Women's One Day Internationals (WODIs), with two matches played at the VRA Ground in Amstelveen and one match at Sportpark Westvliet in The Hague. These were the first WODI matches played by the Netherlands Women since 2011, after the International Cricket Council granted them ODI status in May 2022.

Ireland won the first match of the series after bowling the hosts out for just 84 runs. Ireland dominated the second game of the series, setting Irish WODI records including highest total (337/8), highest partnership (236 between Leah Paul and Laura Delany), highest individual score (137 for Leah Paul) and highest margin of victory (210 runs). Ireland wrapped up a clean sweep of the series, winning the final game by 8 wickets.

Squads

WODI series

1st WODI

2nd WODI

3rd WODI

References

External links
 Series home at ESPNcricinfo

2022 in Dutch cricket
2022 in Irish cricket
International cricket competitions in 2022
2022 in women's cricket